Pietro Beruatto (born 21 December 1998) is an Italian professional footballer who plays as full-back for  club Pisa.

Club career

Vicenza 
On 28 July 2017, Beruatto was loaned from Juventus to Serie C club Vicenza on a season-long loan deal. On 30 July, Beruatto made his professional debut for Vicenza in a 4–1 home win over Pro Piacenza in the first round of Coppa Italia, he played the entire match. On 27 August, Beruatto made his Serie C debut for Vicenza in a 3–0 home win over Gubbio, he was replaced by Federico Giraudo in the 81st minute. On 10 September, he played his first entire match for Vicenza, a 1–0 home win over Teramo.

In January 2018 he returned to Juventus leaving Vicenza with 14 appearances, 11 as a starter. On 20 August 2020, Beruatto returned on loan to Vicenza.

Pisa 
On 15 July 2021, Beruatto moved to Serie B side Pisa on loan with option to buy, which was exercised on 20 June 2022.

Personal life
Beruatto is the son of Paolo, a former professional footballer who played for Torino, Monza, Avellino and Lazio.

Career statistics

Club

Honours 
Juventus
 Torneo di Viareggio: 2016

Juventus U23
 Coppa Italia Serie C: 2019–20

References

1998 births
Footballers from Trieste
Living people
Italian footballers
Italy youth international footballers
Association football defenders
Juventus F.C. players
Juventus Next Gen players
L.R. Vicenza players
Pisa S.C. players
Serie B players
Serie C players